Shorea venulosa is a tree in the family Dipterocarpaceae, native to Borneo. The specific epithet venulosa means "small veins", referring to the leaf.

Description
The dark brown bark is fissured and becomes flaky. The inflorescences bear pink flowers.

Distribution and habitat
Shorea venulosa is endemic to Borneo.

References

venulosa
Endemic flora of Borneo
Plants described in 1963